Garry Malcolm James (born September 4, 1963) is a former professional American football running back in the National Football League. He played three seasons for the Detroit Lions (1986–1988).

James played three seasons in the Lions backfield with fullback James Jones. The tandem became known as the "James Gang."

References

1963 births
Living people
People from Marrero, Louisiana
Players of American football from Louisiana
American football running backs
LSU Tigers football players
Detroit Lions players